(23 June 1889 – 29 December 1964), better known by his pen name , was a Japanese poet, children's book author and essayist. He is considered a significant representative of Japanese symbolism.

Life 

Miki was born in Tatsuno in Hyōgo Prefecture in 1889, the oldest son of Setsujirō Miki and Kata Midorikawa (1869–1962). Midorikawa married at 15, and was a nurse and a significant figure in the women's movement of the Meiji period. He had one brother, Tsutomu. After the divorce of his parents in 1895 when he was 5 years old, Miki grew up with his grandfather, who was the first mayor of Tatsuno. He attended elementary and middle school in Tatsuno and wrote poems, haiku and tankas as a student.

At the age of 17, he published his first collection of poems, and at 20 his poetry collection Haien, which received attention at the time for its free verse. Miki was regarded as an early talent and he gained attention along with Hakushū Kitahara, to whom he has been compared in style and stature.

He studied literature at Waseda University and Keiō University. Around 1918, he joined Miekichi Suzuki's recently founded children's literature magazine Akai tori ("Red Bird"), to which he contributed work, participating in the magazine's new movement to create high-quality, beautiful and emotional children's verses and songs, called dōyō.

Three years later he published a collection of verses for children named Shinjushima ("Pearl Island"), which included the poem , which Kosaku Yamada set to music in 1927. In 1989, "Akatombo" was voted Japan's favorite song in a survey by the NHK show "Japanese Songs, Hometown Songs". A large wall-sized monument to the song, with memorial plaques, stands in Miki's home town, Tatsuno.

From 1916 to 1924 Miki worked in Kamiiso, Hokkaido (modern day Hokuto) in a Trappist monastery as a teacher of literature. During this time, he was baptized in 1922 and joined the Catholic faith. His faith is reflected in the essays Shūdōin seikatsu and Nihon katorikkukyōshi (History of Catholicism in Japan).

In 1927, he was awarded the Holy Sepulchre of Jerusalem by the Vatican. In 1963 he was awarded the Japanese Medal of Honor with a purple ribbon.

On 21 December 1964, Miki was hit by a taxi and taken to hospital with head injuries. He died of a brain haemorrhage eight days later at the age of 75. Kosaku Yamada, who wrote the music to Akatombo, died on the same day one year later. He was awarded the Order of the Sacred Treasure in 1965. Since 1985, his hometown has been hosting a competition for children's songs, giving a prize named after him (Miki Rofū-shō).

Works (selected)

Poetry 
 1908 Yameru Bara (The Sick Rose)
 1909 Haien (translated as The Ruined Garden or Abandoned Garden)
 1910 Sabishiki akebono
 1913 Rofūshū
 1915 Ryōshin
 1920 Sei to ai
 1921 Shinjushima (Pearl Island)
 1922 Shinkō no akebono (Dawn of Faith)
 1926 Kami to hito (Gods and Men)
 1926 Torapisuto kashū – anthology

Essays 
 1925 Shūdōin sappitsu
 1926 Shūdōin seikatsu
 1928 Waga ayumeru michi
 1929 Nihon katorikkukyōshi (History of Catholicism in Japan)

References

External links 

 
 

20th-century Japanese poets
Japanese essayists
1889 births
1964 deaths
Writers from Hyōgo Prefecture
19th-century Japanese poets
Recipients of the Order of the Sacred Treasure, 4th class
Japanese male poets
Waseda University alumni
Keio University alumni
Knights of the Holy Sepulchre
Recipients of the Medal of Honor (Japan)
20th-century essayists